Simone Grippo (born 12 December 1988) is a Swiss footballer who plays for FC Lausanne-Sport as a central defender.

Football career
Born in Ettingen, Grippo came through the ranks in the FC Basel youth system and played for two years in their reserve team. He was sent out on a loan to feeder club FC Concordia Basel during the 2007–08 season. He originally had a half season-long loan spell at Concordia Basel but this was extended in December into a full season loan.

In summer 2008 he joined AC Bellinzona on loan, but just one month later, on 5 August, he signed for A.C. ChievoVerona of Italian Serie A on a permanent contract.

He made his first appearance for Chievo Verona on 11 January 2009, which resulted in a 1–1 draw against FC Bologna.

Grippo signed for Lugano in summer 2011. After only one year he transferred to Servette on 15 July 2012, signing a 3-year contract. He made his debut in a 5–1 loss away defeat against Lausanne-Sport.

On 19 December 2013, the Swiss Football League (SFL) announced that Grippo had signed for Vaduz. On 13 June 2017, he signed a two-year contract with Spanish Segunda División side Real Zaragoza. On 13 January 2020, he signed for Segunda side Real Oviedo.

International career
Grippo is of Italian descent. He is a youth international for Switzerland.

Honours
Basel
 Swiss Champion at U-18 level: 2006
 Swiss Cup Winner at U-19/U-18 level: 2006

Vaduz
Swiss Challenge League: 2013–14
Liechtensteiner Cup: 2013–14, 2014–15, 2015–16, 2016–17

References

External links

Profile at Lega-Calcio.it

Living people
1988 births
Association football central defenders
Swiss men's footballers
Switzerland under-21 international footballers
Switzerland youth international footballers
Swiss people of Italian descent
Swiss expatriate footballers
Swiss expatriate sportspeople in Italy
Swiss expatriate sportspeople in Spain
Expatriate footballers in Italy
Swiss Super League players
Swiss Challenge League players
Serie A players
Serie B players
Segunda División players
FC Basel players
FC Concordia Basel players
AC Bellinzona players
A.C. ChievoVerona players
Piacenza Calcio 1919 players
F.C. Lumezzane V.G.Z. A.S.D. players
Frosinone Calcio players
FC Lugano players
Servette FC players
FC Vaduz players
Swiss expatriate sportspeople in Liechtenstein
Expatriate footballers in Liechtenstein
Real Zaragoza players
Real Oviedo players
FC Lausanne-Sport players